The 1997–98 Spartan South Midlands Football League season was the first in the history of Spartan South Midlands Football League. The league was formed by the merger of the Spartan League and the South Midlands League.

The league consisted of 75 clubs divided into five divisions.

For this season only both Premier Division and Division One were split geographically into two sections, as the Premier Division North was a successor of the South Midlands League Premier Division, and the Premier Division South was a successor of the Spartan League Premier Division. Senior Division was a successor of the South Midlands League Senior Division. Division One North was a successor of the South Midlands League Division One, and the Division One South was a successor of the Spartan League divisions One and Two.

At the end of the season Premier divisions were merged, while Division One North was renamed Division One as all the Division One South clubs resigned from the league and formed the London Intermediate League.

Premier Division North

The division featured 15 clubs, all came from the South Midlands League Premier Division.

League table

Premier Division South

The division featured 15 clubs, all came from Spartan League Premier Division.

League table

Senior Division

The division featured 13 clubs which competed in the previous season South Midlands League Senior Division, along with three new clubs.
Two clubs, promoted from South Midlands League Division One:
Biggleswade United
Caddington
One club joined the Division:
Shillington, who last competed in the 1995–96 season in the South Midlands League

League table

Division One North

The division featured 16 clubs which competed in the previous season South Midlands League Division One, along with one new club:
Greenacres

League table

Division One South

The division featured ten clubs which competed in the previous season Spartan League divisions One and Two, along with five clubs:
Crown & Manor
Chestnut Trojans
Leyton
Leyton Youth
Tottenham Omada

League table

References

External links
 FCHD Spartan South Midlands Football League page

1997–98
1997–98 in English football leagues